"Mr. Jones" is a song by American alternative rock band Counting Crows. It was released in December 1993 as the lead single from their debut album, August and Everything After (1993). It was the band's first radio hit and has been described as their breakout single. "Mr. Jones" reached number five on the Billboard Hot 100 Airplay charts (now Billboard Radio Songs). Internationally, the song peaked at number one in Canada and number seven in France. In April 2022, American Songwriter ranked the song at number four on their list of "The Top 10 Counting Crows Songs".

Background and composition
"Mr. Jones" debuted on the US Billboard Radio Songs chart on January 22, 1994, and entered the top 10 five weeks later. On May 14, 1994, the song reached its peak US chart position at number five.

The band's surprise success happened to coincide with Kurt Cobain's death. These events took a significant toll on Adam Duritz, the lead vocalist and principal songwriter. Duritz said in an interview, "We heard that, that [Kurt] had shot himself. And it really scared the hell out of me because I thought, these things in my life are getting so out of control." These events and feelings were the basis for "Catapult", the first track of Recovering the Satellites.

According to Duritz (who was born in 1964), the song title had a hand in the naming by Jonathan Pontell of "Generation Jones", the group of people born between 1954 and 1965. "I feel honored that my song Mr. Jones was part of the inspiration for the name 'Generation Jones'."

The song incorporates two different key signatures into the music, as demonstrated by verses being written in A Minor with a chord structure of Am-F-Dm-G before transitioning into C major in the chorus and a new chord sequence of C-F-G. In addition, "Mr. Jones" is written in 4/4 and possesses a speed of 142 beats per minute.

Lyrics and performances
The song is about struggling musicians (Duritz and bassist Marty Jones of The Himalayans) who "want to be big stars," believing that "when everybody loves me, I will never be lonely." Duritz would later recant these values; and in some later concert appearances, "Mr. Jones" was played in a subdued acoustic style, if at all. On the live CD Across a Wire Duritz changes the lyrics "We all wanna be big, big stars, but we got different reasons for that"  to "We all wanna be big, big stars, but then we get second thoughts about that"; he also changed the lyrics "when everybody loves you, sometimes that's just about as funky as you can be" to "when everybody loves you, sometimes that's just about as fucked up as you can be."

Some believe the song is a veiled reference to the protagonist of Bob Dylan's "Ballad of a Thin Man", based on the lyric "I wanna be Bob Dylan, Mr. Jones wishes he was someone just a little more funky." According to Adam Duritz on VH1 Storytellers, "It's really a song about my friend Marty and I. We went out one night to watch his dad play, his dad was a Flamenco guitar player who lived in Spain (David Serva), and he was in San Francisco in the mission playing with his old Flamenco troupe. And after the gig we all went to this bar called the New Amsterdam in San Francisco on Columbus."

In a 2013 interview, Duritz explained that even though the song is named for his friend Marty Jones, it is actually about Duritz himself. "I wrote a song about me, I just happened to be out with him that night," Duritz said. The inspiration for the song came as Duritz and Jones were drunk at a bar after watching Jones' father perform, when they saw Kenney Dale Johnson, longtime drummer for the musician Chris Isaak, sitting with three women. "It just seemed like, you know, we couldn't even manage to talk to girls, ... we were just thinking if we were rock stars, it'd be easier. I went home and wrote the song," Duritz said.

In the live version of the song, as on the album Across a Wire: Live in New York City, the first couplet of the song is a quotation of the 1967 song "So You Want to Be a Rock 'n' Roll Star" by The Byrds.

Accolades

Track listings
 "Mr. Jones" (LP version) – 4:32
 "Raining in Baltimore" (LP version) – 4:42
 "Mr. Jones" (acoustic version) – 4:44
 "Rain King" (acoustic version) – 5:10

Credits and personnel
 Composers – David Bryson, Adam Duritz
 Performed by – Counting Crows
 Producers – T-Bone Burnett, Bruce Ranes
 Executive producer – Gary Gersh
 Mixing – Scott Litt, Patrick McCarthy
 Engineers – Patrick McCarthy, Bruce Ranes
 Photography – Michael Tighe

Charts

Weekly charts

Year-end charts

Certifications

Release history

Covers
The band Hidden in Plain View did a cover of "Mr. Jones" which was released in 2004 on the album Dead and Dreaming: An Indie Tribute to the Counting Crows.

References

External links
 "Mr. Jones" at Counting Crows' official web site.
 "Mr. Jones" at Lyrics Undercover: a podcast explaining the lyrics of the song and the identity of Mr. Jones.

1993 debut singles
1993 songs
Counting Crows songs
Cultural depictions of Bob Dylan
Geffen Records singles
RPM Top Singles number-one singles
Song recordings produced by T Bone Burnett
Songs written by Adam Duritz
Songs written by Charlie Gillingham
Songs written by Dan Vickrey
Songs written by David Bryson
Jangle pop songs